Alessandro Tambellini (born 30 April 1955) is an Italian politician.

Tambellini was born in Lucca, Italy. He is married and has three children.

He is member of the Democratic Party. Tambellini was elected Mayor of Lucca on 20 May 2012 and re-confirmed for the second term on 25 June 2017.

On 10 March 2020 he announced he had tested positive for SARS-CoV-2.

References

External links 

 
 

Living people
1955 births
Democratic Party (Italy) politicians
21st-century Italian politicians
Mayors of Lucca
Politicians from Lucca